Hesperilla mastersi, also known as the chequered sedge-skipper or Master's skipper, is a species of butterfly in the family Hesperiidae. It is found in the Australian states of New South Wales, Queensland and Victoria. It was also found in Tasmania, but the small area where its food plant was growing was cleared to provide cattle pasture. It is probably now extinct in Tasmania.

The wingspan is about 40 mm.

The larvae feed on Gahnia melanocarpa and Gahnia radula. They constructs a make a shelter joining leaves of their host with silk. They remain in this shelter during the day and come out to feed at night. Pupation takes place within this shelter.

External links
Australian Insects
Australian Faunal Directory

Trapezitinae
Butterflies described in 1900
Butterflies of Africa